Zaki Saad al-Dine was an Egyptian swimmer. He competed in two events at the 1936 Summer Olympics.

References

Year of birth missing
Year of death missing
Egyptian male swimmers
Olympic swimmers of Egypt
Swimmers at the 1936 Summer Olympics
Place of birth missing